Mohamed Camara (born October 21, 1980) is a Guinean professional footballer who spent the majority of his playing career in Belgium, and also had a spell in Greece with Ethnikos Asteras.

Playing career
Camara previously played for Germinal Beerschot in the Belgian First Division.

 2005/2006 - Ethnikos Asteras
 2005/2006 - Germinal Beerschot - 5/1
 2004/2005 - Germinal Beerschot - 24/1
 2003/2004 - Germinal Beerschot - 31/4
 2002/2003 - Germinal Beerschot - 3/1

References

1980 births
Living people
Guinean footballers
Guinean expatriate footballers
Expatriate footballers in Belgium
R.A.A. Louviéroise players
K.F.C. Dessel Sport players
Beerschot A.C. players
Belgian Pro League players
Challenger Pro League players
K.R.C. Zuid-West-Vlaanderen players

Association football midfielders